Broadway Video is an American multimedia entertainment studio founded by Lorne Michaels, creator of the sketch comedy TV series Saturday Night Live and producer of other television programs and movies. Broadway Video also held the rights to much of the pre-1974 Rankin-Bass library and Lassie from 1988 to 1996 before they sold the rights to Golden Books Family Entertainment (now owned by NBCUniversal/Universal Pictures via DreamWorks Animation/Classic Media).

History

Lorne Michaels, who launched Saturday Night Live in 1975, produced several television specials under the banner of Above Average Productions before incorporating Broadway Video in 1979.  Michaels took the company's name from its location at 1619 Broadway in the historic Brill Building in New York, New York.  Initially, the company's principal activity was videotape post-production. One of its main clients was NBC, which hired Michaels to produce and edit Best of Saturday Night specials that aired in prime time.  The specials and other comedy and musical projects helped Broadway Video grow "from a one-room operation into a first-class production company, the foundation of a small empire."

Broadway Video later "prospered" by moving into home entertainment, acquisition, and international syndication.  With offices in New York and Los Angeles, the company has continued to develop films and TV programming. Its sitcom, 30 Rock, ran for seven seasons between 2006 and 2013.  Besides SNL, its current TV productions include The Tonight Show Starring Jimmy Fallon, Late Night with Seth Meyers, Mulaney, Portlandia, The Awesomes, Man Seeking Woman, and The Maya Rudolph Show. The company's Above Average Productions distributes its own original digital shorts, and those of others, on one of YouTube’s leading comedy networks.
Broadway Video Enterprises distributes the company's library and develops branded entertainment.  Broadway Video Ventures invests in emerging technology, media, and entertainment companies. His production company signed a film deal with Universal Pictures in 2018 after its original deal with Paramount ended.

Divisions

Broadway Video Television
Broadway Video Television develops and produces primetime and late night programming.  Its flagship show,  Saturday Night Live, where Michaels remains Executive Producer, began its 47th season in September 2021.  Michaels also has served as Executive Producer of NBC's  Late Night franchise for more than two decades – producing Late Night With Conan O'Brien (1993–2009), Late Night With Jimmy Fallon (2009–2014), and Late Night With Seth Meyers (2014–present). In 2014, Michaels took on the role of Executive Producer of The Tonight Show Starring Jimmy Fallon.  Since 2011, Broadway Video has produced Portlandia, the Peabody-winning IFC series created by Fred Armisen, Carrie Brownstein, and Jonathan Krisel. The show, which ran for eight seasons between 2011 and 2018, was distributed in 91 nations. The company's animated series, The Awesomes, created by Seth Meyers and Mike Shoemaker, premiered on Hulu in 2013 and ran for three seasons  (30 episodes total) through 2015. Mulaney, which aired on Fox in the fall of 2014, stared comedian John Mulaney,
It has also been involved with  Man Seeking Woman, based on Last Girlfriend on Earth by Simon Rich,  Documentary Now, created by Fred Armisen, Bill Hader, and Seth Meyers, and the served as the producer of The Maya Rudolph Show  variety show pilot that aired on NBC on May 19, 2014.

Broadway Video Film
Michaels has developed and produced such films as Mean Girls (2004), Enigma (2001), Tommy Boy (1995), Lassie (1994), and Wayne's World (1992), among other titles.  His SNL Studios productions have included The Ladies Man (2000), Superstar (1999), and A Night at the Roxbury (1998).  Michaels’ co-productions with John Goldwyn include The Guilt Trip (2012), MacGruber (2010), and Baby Mama (2008).  Other work includes Staten Island Summer, written by Colin Jost and directed by Rhys Thomas

Above Average Productions
Broadway Video revived the Above Average name in June 2012, when it created a division for producing digital content.
The company distributes original comedy shorts via its website, AboveAverage.com, and the Above Average network on YouTube.  As of 2014, the network featured over 50 channel partners, including such comedy troupes as the Upright Citizens Brigade, The Lonely Island, Good Neighbor, POYKPAC,  and BriTANicK. Its videos frequently feature current and former Saturday Night Live cast members such as Vanessa Bayer, Kristen Wiig, Jay Pharoah, Jason Sudeikis, Taran Killam, and Kate McKinnon as well as up-and-coming comedians.
Among the network's most viewed web series are 7 Minutes in Heaven with Mike O'Brien and "Waco Valley," an animated series that received a pilot order from the Comedy Central network. Above Average Productions also creates promotional entertainment for client companies, including Hasbro, Fox Digital Studios, Random House, Sprint, NBC, Conde Nast Entertainment, and Nickelodeon.

In October 2015, Above Average partnered with SNL co-head writer Bryan Tucker to launch a new sports comedy brand, The Kicker. The Kicker creates original sports comedy videos, articles, images, and digital content that are similar in tone to that of Above Average.

Broadway Video Enterprises
Broadway Video Enterprises manages the distribution and licensing of Broadway Video Entertainment's properties.  The company's library contains over 1,000 hours of programming including Saturday Night Live, Portlandia, The Awesomes, Above Average webisodes, The Kids in the Hall, The Best of the Blues Brothers, All You Need Is Cash, and musical performances by Neil Young, Randy Newman, and The Beach Boys. The division has syndicated episodes of "Saturday Night Live" in over 200 countries and has licensed the "SNL" format in Italy, Spain, Japan, Korea, Brazil, Russia, Canada, Mexico, France, Turkey and Germany. The SNL consumer products line offers several hundred items, including over 100 DVDs. The Enterprises division has also engineered advertising and promotions for brands such as AT&T, Verizon, Old Navy, and Jeep.

Broadway Video Ventures
Broadway Video Ventures invests in and partners with emerging media, entertainment, and technology firms that complement the company's existing enterprises.  Investments by Broadway Video or its strategic partners include Nerdist Industries (acquired by Legendary Entertainment), Zefr, StrikeAd, Evenly (acquired by Square, Inc.), and Optimal (acquired by Brand Networks). Ventures also develops and launches new businesses, including the digital comedy subsidiary Above Average Productions  and the astrology app Sanctuary.

Broadway Video Post-Production
Broadway Video Post-Production specializes in the completion of television, film, music, digital, and commercial projects.  The division offers design and editorial services, as well as suites for offline editing, online finishing, color correction, compositing, sound design, sweetening, scoring and mixing. Besides working on Broadway Video's own productions, the division has collaborated with organizations including NBCUniversal, MTV, VH1, Showtime Networks, USA Network, Discovery Channel, Nickelodeon, American Express, Walmart, and Procter & Gamble.

Awards
"Saturday Night Live" has won 40 Primetime Emmy Awards and currently holds the title for most-nominated show, with 187 Emmy nominations as of July 2014.  "SNL" has been honored twice, in 1990 and 2009, with a Peabody Award and was inducted into the Broadcasting Hall of Fame.
"Portlandia" has won two Emmys and received six nominations,
as well as a 2012 Peabody Award. "30 Rock" won 16 Emmys and received 103 nominations. It also won a Peabody Award in 2007. "Late Night with Conan O'Brien" won one Emmy and received 28 nominations. "Late Night with Jimmy Fallon" won one Emmy and received six nominations. "The Kids in the Hall" received three Emmy nominations. Lorne Michaels’ honors include one personal Peabody Award, 13 Prime Time Emmy Awards, induction into the Television Academy of Arts and Sciences Hall of Fame, and the Mark Twain Prize for American Humor.

Location

Broadway Video’s principal offices in New York are located in La Maison Francaise, part of the Rockefeller Center complex. Broadway Video Post-Production and Above Average Productions are based in the Brill Building, located a few blocks west in Midtown Manhattan. Principal offices in Los Angeles are located at 9401 Wilshire Boulevard in Beverly Hills, California. Broadway Video Film also has offices on the Paramount Pictures lot in Los Angeles.

Productions
Below is a list of audio, film, and television projects in which Broadway Video has been involved.

Audio

Film

Television

See also
Broadway Comics
 NBC
 Universal Television
 SNL Studios

References

External links
 

Film production companies of the United States
Television production companies of the United States
Companies based in New York City
Entertainment companies established in 1979